Edward Lyons (1926–2010) was a British politician.

Edward Lyons may also refer to:
Edward F. Lyons Jr. (1899–1990), World War II veteran who supported the prosecution of German war criminals
Edward H. Lyons (1855–1920), American businessman, farmer, and politician
Eddie Lyons (1886–1926), film actor, director and screenwriter
Eddie Lyons (footballer) (1920–1996), English footballer
Ed Lyons (1923–2009), American baseball player
Ned Lyons (c. 1839–1906), Irish-American gangster

See also
Ed Lyon, British tenor
Edward E. Lyon (1871–1931), Medal of Honor recipient
Edmund Lyons (disambiguation)
Lyons (surname)